Sewell Anton Peterson (February 28, 1850 – September 20, 1915) was an American politician.

Born in Norway, he settled in Wisconsin in 1861. He was the son of Ole and Martha Peterson. He lived in Menomonie, Wisconsin, where he was a merchant. During that time, Peterson served on the Menomonie Common Council. Then he moved to Rice Lake, Wisconsin, where he served as city clerk, city treasurer, and mayor. In 1893, he served in the Wisconsin State Assembly. From 1895 to 1899, he served as the Wisconsin State Treasurer. He was an alternate delegate to Republican National Convention from Wisconsin in 1900. He died in Rice Lake in 1915 after accidentally shooting himself in the stomach while hunting. He was buried at the Nora Cemetery in Rice Lake, Wisconsin.

Notes

1850 births
1915 deaths
People from Menomonie, Wisconsin
People from Barron County, Wisconsin
Wisconsin city council members
Mayors of places in Wisconsin
Members of the Wisconsin State Assembly
State treasurers of Wisconsin
Businesspeople from Wisconsin
Norwegian emigrants to the United States
19th-century American politicians
19th-century American businesspeople
Hunting accident deaths
Firearm accident victims in the United States
Accidental deaths in Wisconsin
Deaths by firearm in Wisconsin